Manfred IV (died 1330) was the fifth marquess of Saluzzo from 1296, the son of Thomas I and Luisa of Ceva.

Biography
Manfred forced the commune of Saluzzo (granted it by his father) to sign a contract regulating the relations between the city, its podestà, and the marquess.

Manfred also continued his father's extension of the margravial territory, mostly through annexations of land and castles. On 27 August 1305, Manfred paid fealty to Amadeus V of Savoy for the Marquisate of Saluzzo.  In 1322, in return for reorganising the debts of the Del Carretto family, he obtained the castles of Cairo Montenotte, Rocchetta, and Cortemilia.

By his first marriage, to Beatrix of Sicily, daughter of Manfred of Sicily and Helena Angelina Doukaina, Manfred had one son: Frederick.  However, he fell under the influence of his second wife, Isabella Doria, by whom he had three children (Manfred, Theodore, and Boniface), and tried to appoint his second eldest son Manfred to the succession.  This precipitated a civil war after his death in 1330 that lasted until 29 July 1332, when the throne was ceded to Frederick.

Marriages and children
Manfred IV married first Beatrix of Sicily, daughter of Manfred of Sicily and Helena Angelina Doukaina. They had two children:

Frederick I of Saluzzo
Caterina of Saluzzo. Married William Enganna, Lord of the Barge.

He married secondly Isabella Doria, daughter of Bernabo Doria and Eleonora Fieschi. Her parents were Patricians of the Republic of Genoa. They had four children:

Manfred V of Saluzzo
Boniface of Saluzzo.
Theodore of Saluzzo.
Eleonora of Saluzzo. Married Oddone I, Marquess of Ceva.

He also had an illegitimate daughter, Elinda of Saluzzo.

Notes

References

Sources

External links

|-

13th-century births
1330 deaths
Marquesses of Saluzzo
Aleramici